There are several lakes named Mud Lake within the U.S. state of Missouri.

 Mud Lake, Buchanan County, Missouri.	
 Mud Lake, Platte County, Missouri.		
 Mud Lake, St. Charles County, Missouri.

References
 USGS-U.S. Board on Geographic Names

Lakes of Missouri